Mycetophagus quadriguttatus, known generally as the spotted hairy fungus beetle or four-spotted fungus beetle, is a species of hairy fungus beetle in the family Mycetophagidae. It is found in Africa, Australia, Europe and Northern Asia (excluding China), North America, and Southern Asia.

References

Further reading

External links

 

Tenebrionoidea
Articles created by Qbugbot
Beetles described in 1821